Charles Talbot Blayney, 8th Baron Blayney (27 January 1714 – 29 September 1761) was an Anglican priest in Ireland in the eighteenth century.

Blayney was born in Dublin and educated at St John's College, Cambridge. He was Dean of Killaloe from 1750 until his death.

Notes

Alumni of St John's College, Cambridge
Deans of Killaloe
18th-century Irish Anglican priests
Christian clergy from Dublin (city)
1714 births
1761 deaths
Barons Blayney